Gareth Evans may refer to:

Sportspeople
 Gareth Evans (footballer, born 1967), English former professional footballer
 Gareth Evans (footballer, born 1981), English former professional footballer
 Gareth Evans (footballer, born 1987), Welsh professional footballer currently playing for Oklahoma City Energy FC
 Gareth Evans (footballer, born 1988), English current professional footballer who plays for Bradford City
 Gareth Evans (rugby union, born 1952), Welsh former rugby union player
 Gareth Evans (rugby union, born August 1991), New Zealand rugby union player for Hawke's Bay and the Hurricanes
 Gareth Evans (rugby union, born September 1991), English rugby union player for Gloucester
 Gareth Evans (weightlifter) (born 1986), British weightlifter

Other
 Gareth Evans (filmmaker) (born 1980), Welsh film director
 Gareth Evans (geneticist) (born 1959), British geneticist
 Gareth Evans (philosopher) (1946–1980), philosopher at Oxford University
 Gareth Evans (politician) (born 1944), Australian former politician

See also
 Garth Evans, sculptor
 Gary Evans (disambiguation)
 Gareth Edwards (disambiguation)